The Ford Mustang SSP is a lightweight police car package that was based on the Ford Mustang and produced by Ford between 1982-1993.  The car was meant to provide a speedier option for police departments in lieu of other full sized (and heavier) sedans on the market at the time.  The SSP abbreviation means Special Service Package, a special Foxbody Mustang trim made exclusively for law enforcement use.  One of the taglines used by Ford to help sell this car was This Ford chases Porsches for a living...

The units served a number of uses, and were often customized to suit each law enforcement agency's particular needs.  Law enforcement agencies from municipal to government agencies bought nearly 15,000 examples of these units.  Many still exist today, either still in some role of law enforcement, from display cars to DARE cars, or in the hands of collectors and racers.

History
In 1982, the California Highway Patrol asked the Ford Motor Company to produce a capable and lightweight police car due to the bulkiness of current police cars like the Ford Fairmont and LTD/Crown Victoria and the problems incurred with Chevrolet Camaros with their camshafts and engine problems at pursuit speeds.  Taking the Fox 5.0 Mustangs in production at the time, Ford produced the Ford Mustang SSP and modified them to suit the needs of the police and law enforcement departments.

It is estimated that nearly 15,000 of these special units were made from 1982 until their discontinuation in 1993 for over 60 law enforcement organizations and government agencies.  Their roles ranged from general patrol to pursuit units, with some used in special duties like drug interdiction to academy training units.  Several units were specially tasked to help land the Lockheed U-2 Spyplane.

Specifications

The Mustang SSP was essentially a more rugged version of the 5.0 Mustang, with added features (some standard, some optional) not available to the general public.  Some of the additional features were:

 Engine oil cooler
 Silicone radiator hoses and aircraft-style clamps
 Auto transmission fluid cooler
 130 and 135 amp internally and externally regulated heavy duty alternators
 Two-piece VASCAR speedometer cable
 Certified calibrated speedometer 0-140 mph (1982-early 1989) and 0-160 mph (late 1989-1993)
 Non-operational courtesy lights (safety feature)
 Relocated rear deck release
 Single key locking doors/trunk
 Reinforced floor pans
 Full size spare tire

Depending on which agency bought them, extras like rollcages (installed by Oregon State Police and Kentucky State Police) and power windows (requested by New York State Police) made each SSP unique to their respective departments.  The original configuration of the civilian Mustang with its small rear seat and manual transmission were generally considered ill-suited for a law-enforcement vehicle.  Many SSPs had automatic transmissions, to free an officer's hand from using the manual transmission stick so that they could use the hand for other duties, such as speaking on a radio.

Usage

Some of the known users of the Mustang SSP include:

United States Government

Drug Enforcement Administration
Federal Bureau of Investigation
Immigration and Naturalization Service
United States Postal Service - 6 were used in the Los Angeles area in California
United States Air Force - Used as a chase car for the U-2 Spy Plane.
United States Border Patrol - Drug interdiction; resides at USBP Museum in Texas.
United States Customs Service
US Fish and Wildlife Service

State governments
Alabama State Troopers
Arizona Department of Public Safety
California Highway Patrol - Initial purchaser of the Mustang SSP
Colorado State Patrol
Connecticut State Police
Delaware State Police
Florida Highway Patrol - Second biggest user of the Mustang SSP.
Georgia State Patrol
Idaho State Police
Indiana State Police	
Kansas Highway Patrol
Kentucky State Police
Louisiana State Police
Massachusetts State Police	
Michigan State Police	
Minnesota State Patrol
Mississippi Highway Patrol	
Missouri Highway Patrol
Nebraska State Patrol
Nevada Highway Patrol
New Mexico State Police	
New York State Police
North Carolina Highway Patrol
Oklahoma Highway Patrol
Oregon State Police
Pennsylvania State Police	
Rhode Island State Police	
South Carolina Highway Patrol
Tennessee Highway Patrol
Texas Department of Public Safety - Third biggest user of the Mustang SSP
Utah Highway Patrol
Virginia State Police - Manual transmission - Unmarked cars
Washington State Patrol
Wisconsin State Patrol	
Wyoming Highway Patrol

City/County governments
 Arlington, TX Police Department
 Douglas County, GA Sheriff's Department
 Atlanta, GA Police Department
 Smithfield, VA Police Department
 Clearwater, FL Police Department
 Fort Worth, TX Police Department
 Jonesboro, AR Police Department
 New York City Police Department - Highway Patrol Branch
 Pensacola, FL Police Department
 San Francisco Police Department
 Winter Park FL Police Department
 Beverly Hills, CA Police Department
 Portland Police Bureau, OR
 Gilroy, CA Police Department
 Earth, TX Police Department
 Tarrant County, TX Sheriff's Department
 Stephenville TX Police Department
 Parachute, CO Police Department
 Pinellas County Sheriff's Office, Largo Florida
 Homerville, GA Clinch County Sherriffs Office
 Dickinson County, KS Sheriff’s Office
 Lancaster County, NE Sheriff's Office [Had 4 1990 Automatic cars]

Canada

 Royal Canadian Mounted Police

Disposition

Most of the Mustang SSPs have been retired from service, with a few examples still on the rosters of police departments as display or DARE cars.  A few law enforcement agencies still keep them on active duty.  Most examples have found their way into either racing or restoration.

With its stiffened frame and beefed up suspension, many Mustang SSPs were modified for use in drag racing.  The plentiful aftermarket of parts for the 5.0 engine made the SSP platform a desirable frame to work on, but with the dwindling supply and rising prices of genuine Mustang SSPs, these factors have limited racers from converting SSPs for racing purposes.

Restoring Mustang SSPs have become a growing hobby as of late, with car clubs and websites devoted to the restoration of the law enforcement workhorse.  Most enthusiasts strive for accuracy in their models, with many scouring for OEM parts, including police radios, shotgun holders, lights, sirens, and other related equipment.  However, the hobby is limited, as many states have regulations on private citizens owning cars that could be mistaken for real law enforcement vehicles.  Some get around the regulations by using magnetic decals and removable lights.

Distinct models

CHP Hatchback

In 1982, the CHP ordered 400 Special Service Package notchback coupes (394 were built by Ford and shipped to the CHP), and at least 4 cars were SSP hatchbacks.  These four hatchbacks were painted and equipped in the same manner as the SSP coupes.  They were produced under a different 6-digit Fleet DSO number than the SSP coupes, and were retained for use and evaluation by the CHP.  One of these hatchbacks exists in private hands.

CHP EVOC

Several Mustang SSPs were converted by the CHP to EVOC (Emergency Vehicle Operations Course) track vehicles. These EVOC vehicles were used for training the cadets how to drive at high speeds. The Mustangs were known for their 140+- mile per hour top speed. Modifications include a full roll cage, racing harnesses, and tuned front suspension (for high speed driving and cornering). The EVOC vehicles were highly maintained to ensure safety while on the track.

USAF U-2 chase car
Due to problems with landing the Lockheed U-2, a system was implemented where a second pilot would chase the U-2 (termed "mobile") and help guide the aircraft down to earth.  The USAF usually utilized a performance car for this task.

In 1986, the USAF was looking for a replacement for the Chevrolet El Camino as a chase car for the U-2.  Beale Air Force Base asked the local California Highway Patrol to provide a Mustang SSP for testing.  The test proved the Mustang SSP superior to the El Camino and the USAF ordered 20 for work with the spyplanes.

Their career lasted until the late 1990s, when they were replaced by "Special Service" B4C Chevrolet Camaros.

One of three examples from RAF Alconbury is preserved: 1988 Mustang SSP 88B 9971 "Mobile 1", serving with the 17th Reconnaissance Wing and the 95th Reconnaissance Squadron until its disposal in 1999.  It is currently in the hands of a private collector in the United States after being ferried from its last operation in Italy to England.

Saleen connections

Noted manufacturer Saleen contributed to the history of the Mustang SSP.  The Oregon State Police had ordered 34 coupes in 1988, but cancelled the order at the last minute.  The dealership that ordered the coupes, Damerow Ford, scrambled to find a way to get rid of the order, and Saleen took custody of 14 of the cars.  Saleen returned the cars after adding vehicle ID, rear spoiler, ground effects and interior upgrades.  The dealer then resold them.

While not a true SSP, Saleen modified another 5.0, a 1989 5.0 LX Hatchback, for the Seal Beach, California Police Department.  Designated as an S442 model; this model served Seal Beach until its retirement in the late 1990s.

See also
 Ford Mustang
 Police vehicles in the United States

References

Book and magazine references

 Mustang Forty Years, by Randy Leffingwell, 
 Mustang Monthly "For Special Service" by Miles Cook, November 2004 (PDF copy of article here)
  Mustang Monthly "Highly Pursued" text and photos by Donald Farr, May 2006 pg 88-90
 Modified Mustangs "They Come, They Go!: First in Harms Way" sidebar Story by Don Roy Photos by James Pickett, January 2007 pg 117

External links

 SSP Mustang VIN Project
 Mustang Special Service Registry
 Special Service Mustangs
 SSP Mustang SSP Fox Mustang

Coupés
SSP
Hatchbacks
Rear-wheel-drive vehicles
Police vehicles